Lisburn was a borough constituency which elected two MPs for the borough of Lisburn, County Antrim, to the Irish House of Commons, the house of representatives of the Kingdom of Ireland.

Members of Parliament

Notes

References

Citations

Constituencies of the Parliament of Ireland (pre-1801)
Historic constituencies in County Antrim
Politics of Lisburn
1800 disestablishments in Ireland
Constituencies disestablished in 1800